Ryosei Kobayashi (born June 28, 1994 in Kanagawa) is a professional squash player who represents Japan. He reached a career-high world ranking of World No. 63 in September 2021.

References

External links 

Japanese male squash players
Living people
1994 births
Squash players at the 2018 Asian Games
Asian Games competitors for Japan
Competitors at the 2013 World Games